Neelam Mehra is an Indian television and film actress. She presently is playing Karan, Rishabh, Sameer, and Kritika's grandmother, Bani Luthra in the television series Kundali Bhagya.

Filmography

 Nagin
 Dulha Bikta Hai
 Zamane Ko Dikhana Hai
 Kabhii Sautan Kabhii Sahelii
 Kayaamat
 Cheekh (1985)
 Aadamkhor
 Purani Haveli
 Shaitani Ilaaka
 Kohi Apna Sa / *Woh Apna Sa... Nisha 
 Tumhare Liye
 Mukti
 Shaktimaan
 Mr. India (1987)
    Rakhwala (1989 film) as Menaka
Meet Mere Man Ke (1991) as Vidya
 100 Days (1991)
 Insaan Bana Shaitan (1992)
15 August (1993 film) as Neelam
 Zee Horror Show 'Gudiya' (1995)
 Zee Horror Show 'Darwaza' (1996)
 Kaala Mandir (2000)

Television
 Kasamm
 Saas v/s Bahu as Herself 
 Kitani Mohabbat Hai (season 2) as Teji Singhania 
 Woh Rehne Waali Mehlon Ki as  Mrs.Kumar  
 Kahaani Ghar Ghar Kii as Vandana Agrawal 
 Kasamh Se  as Mrs.Tyagi  
 Kundali Bhagya as Bani Luthra 
Anamika   Zee Horror Show Gudia  Maya

References

External links
 

Year of birth missing (living people)
Living people
Place of birth missing (living people)
Indian film actresses
Actresses in Hindi cinema
Actresses from Mumbai